The Lüscher color test is a psychological test invented by Max Lüscher in Basel, Switzerland.
Max Lüscher believed that sensory perception of color is objective and universally shared by all, but that color preferences are subjective, and that this distinction allows subjective states to be objectively measured by using test colors. Lüscher believed that because the color selections are guided in an unconscious manner, they reveal the person as they really are, not as they perceive themselves or would like to be perceived.

Use
Lüscher believed that personality traits could be identified based on one's choice of color. Therefore, subjects who select identical color combinations have similar personalities. In order to measure this, he conducted a test in which subjects were shown 8 different colored cards and asked to place them in order of preference. Colors are divided between "basic" (blue, yellow, red, green) and "auxiliary" (violet, brown, grey, and black).

After subjects placed the cards in order from most liked to least liked, they were asked to evaluate the extent to which their personalities matched the descriptive statements formed by Lüscher of each color.

The results of the Lüscher color diagnostic contain indications pertaining to personal assessment and special, professional recommendations as to how psychological stress and the resulting physical symptoms can be avoided. It also offers additional information for verbal and homeopathic therapy.

A discredited procedure

The test ranks high on a published list of discredited procedures in psychology. It lacks construct validity and is considered as example of the Barnum effect, where an ostensible personality analysis (actually consisting of vague generalities applicable to the majority of people) is reported to be accurate by subjects who had completed a personality test before reviewing their "results". A 1984 comparison of the Lüscher color test and the Minnesota Multiphasic Personality Inventory (MMPI) found little agreement between the two tests, prompting the authors to urge cautious use of the former. Some still stand up for the Lüscher color test as providing high accuracy in a non-verbal test involving as few as eight colors, especially in children even though the majority of the scientific community puts it high on discredited tests lists.

Selected publications
 Adels G. H., Validation of the Luscher-Color-Test as a screening instrument for emotional disturbance in schoolchildren, Diss. Boston University 1978.
 
 
 Klar H., Opium smokers and the psychological and emotional changes after smoking. Medico, Boehringer Mannheim, 1964, №. 1.
 Klar H., Obesity in the Light of the Colour Test, Riv.Medico, Boehringer Mannheim, 1961, №. 3.
 
 
 Lie N., A prospective-longitudinal study of adolescents: A review of projective methods selected for epidemiological research. Stockholm: Karolinska Institutet, 1979 (Lüscher-Test pp103–123); .
 
 
 
 
 Murarasu D. Cosma M., The Psycho-social Relationships evaluated by Lüscher-Color-Test applied in subjects having predominant neuropsychical tasks. Institut of Medical Research, University of Medicine and Pharmacy, Iasi, Romania.
 Schutt D., Perceived Accuracy of Luscher Color Test Interpretation Ratings. California State University Los Angeles, 1999. 1544 Catalina Ave, Pasadena CA 91104–2406, USA.

References

External links
 Lüscher color test home page (multilingual including English)
 ColorQuiz.com Personality Test
 Luscher Color Test

Obsolete medical theories
Personality tests